Blunden is a surname. Notable people with the surname include:

Alice Blunden (died 1674), the subject of a notorious account of premature burial
Andy Blunden (born 1945), Australian writer and Marxist philosopher
Anna Blunden (1829–1915), English pre-Raphaelite artist
Arthur Blunden (1906–1984), English cricketer
Bill Blunden, British television and film editor
Bill Blunden (author), non-fiction writer
Edmund Blunden (1896–1974), English poet, author and critic
Godfrey Blunden (1906–1996), Australian journalist and author
Jeraldyne Blunden (1940–1999), American choreographer
John Blunden (politician) (1695–1752), Irish politician
Sir John Blunden, 1st Baronet (1718–1783), Irish baronet and politician
Mike Blunden (born 1986), Canadian ice hockey player
Peter Blunden, Australian publisher

See also
Blunden baronets of Castle Blunden in the County of Kilkenny, a title in the Baronetage of Ireland
Blunden Harbour, British Columbia, small harbour and native Indian reserve in British Columbia, Canada 
The Amazing Mr Blunden, 1972 British film based on the novel The Ghosts by Antonia Barber
Blindern
Blundell
Blunder (disambiguation)
Blundy
Blunsdon